Madison was an American rock band from New Jersey during 2001-2006.  After releasing their debut EP 'For The First Time in Years... I'm Leaving You' under Fidelity Records, the band signed with Rushmore Records/Drive-Thru Records in 2005.  While together, the band played over 200 shows including a stint on Van's Warped Tour in 2004 and several tours with label mates Hellogoodbye, Hidden in Plain View, Senses Fail, and Houston Calls.  The band also appeared on the Drive Thru Records / PureVolume compilation in 2005. Former bassist, Jonathan Snyder, played for Meg & Dia.

Reunion
In July 2010, Madison reunited for a one-time only show at New Jersey's School of Rock.

References

External links 
 Madison biography
 MySpace page

Pop punk groups from New Jersey
Drive-Thru Records artists
Musical groups established in 2001